is a Japanese footballer currently playing as a forward for Verspah Oita.

Career 

On 5 January 2023, Nagashima was announced as a new signing for Verspah Oita, ahead of the 2023 season.

Career statistics

Club 

.

Notes

Honours
 FC Imabari
 Shikoku Soccer League: 2016
 Japanese Regional Football Champions League: 2016

 Nara Club
 Japan Football League: 2022

References

External links

1998 births
Living people
Japanese footballers
Japanese expatriate footballers
Association football forwards
Japan Football League players
J3 League players
FC Imabari players
Portimonense S.C. players
Nara Club players
Verspah Oita players
Japanese expatriate sportspeople in Portugal
Expatriate footballers in Portugal
Sportspeople from Saitama (city)